Micki DuPont (born April 15, 1980) is a Canadian former professional ice hockey defenseman who last played for Eisbären Berlin in the Deutsche Eishockey Liga (DEL).

Playing career
Normally playing as a defenceman, DuPont was drafted 270th overall in the ninth round by the Calgary Flames in the 2000 NHL Entry Draft.  In his first season in the AHL, Dupont was named the St. John Flames Rookie of the Year, named to the AHL All-Rookie Team after leading the Flames and all AHL rookies in plus/minus at +28, finishing second among all AHL players and played a key role on Saint-John's blue line en route to their first AHL Calder Cup Championship.

He was traded to the Pittsburgh Penguins on March 11, 2003 after playing two seasons with the Flames, but did not play for the Penguins before he moved to the Deutsche Eishockey Liga to play with Eisbären Berlin, and was part of the team which won the 2003–04 DEL Championship. He remained with Berlin for the 2005–06 season, during which he played 52 regular season games and won his second DEL Championship. DuPont was also named to the Canadian squad for the 2006 Men's World Ice Hockey Championships. He played 23 games for the Wilkes-Barre/Scranton Penguins of the AHL in the 2006–07 season before being recalled by Pittsburgh on December 4, 2006.

DuPont was signed by the St. Louis Blues on July 3, 2007. DuPont played the 2008–09 and 2009–10 seasons in Zug, Switzerland for the EV Zug where he led the NLA in most goals for a defenceman in 2009.  In November 2009 it was announced, that DuPont signed a contract with the Kloten Flyers for three years, starting in the 2010–11 season. In 2010–11 and 2011–12, DuPont led the league in most points by a defenceman, with a consistent 41 points in 49 games both seasons.

After five seasons with the Kloten Flyers of the NLA, DuPont agreed to return to Eisbären Berlin of the DEL on May 7, 2015.

Career statistics

Regular season and playoffs

International

Awards and honours

References

External links

1980 births
Calgary Flames draft picks
Calgary Flames players
Canadian ice hockey forwards
Eisbären Berlin players
EV Zug players
Ice hockey people from Calgary
Kamloops Blazers players
EHC Kloten players
Living people
Long Beach Ice Dogs (IHL) players
Pittsburgh Penguins players
Saint John Flames players
San Diego Gulls (WCHL) players
Wilkes-Barre/Scranton Penguins players
Canadian expatriate ice hockey players in Germany
Canadian expatriate ice hockey players in Switzerland